Dustair may refer to:
Düztahir, Azerbaijan
Düztahiroba, Azerbaijan